Ernst Kaps Piano Fabrik  was a German piano manufacturer founded in 1858 with the original factory at 20 to 22 Seminarstrasse in Dresden, Germany. Kaps acquired the title of purveyor of the Kingdom of Saxony.

History
The piano brand Kaps or Ernst Kaps Pianofortefabrik was founded and produced in Dresden Germany in 1858 by Ernst  Karl Wilhelm Kaps. Ernst Kaps was born in Döbeln on 6 December 1826 and died in 1887 in Dresden, Saxony. Kaps was appointed in 1879 an honorary member of the Royal Swedish Academy of Music His son Ernst Eugen, born in 1864, died in early 1910 in Dresden under suspicious circumstances. A report suggested he may have taken his own life as a result of his company facing receivership. His second Son Wilhelm Karl, born in 1872, and died in 1943 in Tolkewitz. However, the "yearbook of wealth and income of the millionaires in the kingdom of Saxony" of 1912 states that two of the family members, Wilhelm and Gertrud Kaps, each had 1.3 M marks and an annual income of 0.11 M Marks. In 1876, the company exhibited at the Centennial International Exhibition in Philadelphia. In 1922, the company, then known as Ernst Kaps Piano Fabrik AG, merged with another company, owned and founded by Johann Kuhse, whose piano manufacturing business was founded in Dresden in 1874. In 1925 the factory, then known as the Kaps/Kuhse Pianoforte AG, made both piano brands alongside each other. The Dresden factory closed in 1930, and at this point the company had reported its final serial number as No. 37500. The Dresden factory produced 37,500 pianos and grand pianos and ever since 1885 manufactured a consistent 1,000 pianos per year. There were showrooms at 13 Altmarkt, Dresden and 18 Schloss -Strasse, Dresden with branches in Paris, London, Irkutsk Oblast and St Petersburg, Russia.

Production resumed under ownership of an Australian company in 2012 with Philip Shayer.

Models
The table below shows the assignment of serial numbers to year of manufacture.

Jean-Henri Pape and Kaps 
It was Jean-Henri Pape (1789–1875), the teacher of Carl Bechstein, who invented and put into use the system of high tension steel strings and copper wound over steel in pianos. Pape, who was also the true inventor of the overstrung piano in 1826, along with many other successful and not so successful inventions, invented the design of an additional pressure bar or individual capo/s located between the hitch pins and the bridges (a similar system later patented by Theodore Steinway in 1872) now known as "duplex scaling". He also introduced the use of compressed felt for hammers.  A good number of these are still in use today.

Some of Pape's  more successful  inventions were employed by a small number of manufacturers fairly early in piano making history, such as Erard, Steinweg, Steinway and Ernst Kaps. In discussions with Pape, it was Ernst Kaps that expanded on  Pape's design, inventing a system of double over-stringing in 1865. This design employed three bridges, Bass, tenor and treble, enabling the production of the, previously troubled, baby grand piano.  This then allowed for a 5 ft (154 cm) length piano to be successfully produced early in piano making history.

As a result of this and other effective inventions, including one known as the "Panzer system" in upright pianos, the company enjoyed many years of commercial success prior to the Dresden factory ceasing production in 1930 reported to have produced some 37,500 pianos at that site.

Ernst Kaps obtained a number of patents on various interesting inventions.  One of these included the "resonator". This consisted of an additional sound-box with small sound ports(holes)drilled through the top.  These were fixed to just below the tenor and treble bridges along the bridges profile. The idea of these were that this would create a larger vibrational mass and additional coincident partials (harmonics)—a complex endeavour to attempt a fuller and more colourful sound.

Inventions and patents

The inventions and developments of Kaps were often patented, including a resonator and a baby grand piano (double overstrung grand piano). Other similar and ingenious inventions were patented by Ernst Kaps such as a device that extended the soundboard into the grand piano lid. Although revolutionary, most were not economically practical and were not commercially produced.

Resonator
One interesting and important invention was the patented resonator as is commonly referred to, whereas, it was officially called, and referred to by Ernst Kaps as the 'sound hood', a device through which additional harmonics were created, particularly in the higher registers.

This consists of a device in the form of a harp shaped sound box contoured to the bridges which is screwed onto the soundboard.  Ernst Kaps obtained a number of patents on various interesting inventions. These additional sound-box fixtures, with small sound ports (holes) drilled through the top, were attached to just below the tenor and treble bridges along the bridge profiles. The idea of these were that this would create 'a larger vibrational mass' and additional 'coincident partials (harmonics)'. A complex endeavour to attempt a fuller and more colourful sound. Ernst Kaps stated that "Each resonant case maybe of a size and length to respond acoustically to the note of the strings passing through it. The resonant cases form in the aggregate what I term a "sound-hood". I am aware that sounding-boxes have been attached to different parts of a piano, such as to the frame or the sounding-board. In all such cases the vibration of the sounding board or case was depended upon to give vibrations to the boxes. In my improvement the air in each resonant case receives a vibration from the string itself when it is struck, thereby the resonant vibrations of the string are communicated directly to the air of the case, which responds thereto". As mentioned, "this device served to give increased resonance to the thinner tones of the soprano and higher registers for a significant boost and timbre, while providing a more consistent and defined ratio between the sound levels".

Baby grand 

In 1865, Kaps built the first double overstrung grand piano. Named ‘the system Kaps’ which referred to a triple bridge arrangement to aid the awkward scaling design, limited by the previously unsuccessful, small sized grand, which were only about 1.50 m long. These, at the time were characterised as having both "solidity and durability of tone" as well as "a lovely yet powerful sound for such a small piano".  Previous attempts at producing a successful small grand piano failed until this time and subsequently, the Kaps Double overstrung 5 ft grand piano, quickly became a revelation.  Hailed as the first successful small grand, later known and promoted by another maker as the "baby grand piano", launched Kaps pianos into commercial success.

Percy Grainger's Kaps piano 
Percy Grainger learned to play on an upright parlour piano of Walnut veneer and ivory keys, made and supplied by Ernst Kaps of Dresden to Rose Grainger. He reported to have practiced on it for two hours a day, while his mother Rose Grainger, as his teacher, sat beside him. In 1895 the Graingers left for Germany when the piano was then sold to a Mr and Mrs Thomas P. Husband, whose family were also taught by Rose. They kept it for 40 years, before donating it to the Grainger Museum at the Melbourne University in 1935. The piano has now been restored and is housed on display at the 'Percy Grainger Museum Melbourne Australia'.

References 

Royal Warrant holders
Piano manufacturing companies of Germany
Manufacturing companies based in Dresden